Ludvík Bombík (26 November 1912 – 29 March 1987) was a Czech long-distance runner. He competed in the men's 10,000 metres at the 1936 Summer Olympics.

References

External links
 

1912 births
1987 deaths
Athletes (track and field) at the 1936 Summer Olympics
Czech male long-distance runners
Olympic athletes of Czechoslovakia